Kohala is a village in Jalandhar. Jalandhar is a district in the Indian state of Punjab.

About 
Kohala lies on the Jalandhar-Kapurthala road at a distance of 4 km from it.  
The nearest railway station to Kohala is Khojewal railway station at a distance of 6 km.

Post code 
Kohala's post code is 144002.

References 

  Official Indian postal site with Kohala's pin code

Villages in Jalandhar district